Kaczki  (German Katzke, Kaski) is a village in the administrative district of Gmina Trąbki Wielkie, within Gdańsk County, Pomeranian Voivodeship, in northern Poland.

For details of the history of the region, see History of Pomerania.

The village has a population of 254.

People 
 Heinrich Czolbe

References

Kaczki